K31FD-D, virtual and UHF digital channel 31, is a low-powered, Class A 3ABN-affiliated television station licensed to Boise, Idaho, United States. Founded on November 18, 1994, the station is owned by HC2 Holdings. The station was owned by 3ABN until 2017, when it was included in a $9.6 million sale of 14 stations to HC2 Holdings.

Digital channels
The station's signal is multiplexed:

References

External links
3ABN official site

Religious television stations in the United States
Three Angels Broadcasting Network
Television channels and stations established in 1994
Low-power television stations in the United States
31FD-D